The 1952 Idaho State Bengals football team was an American football team that represented Idaho State University as a member of the Rocky Mountain Conference (RMC) during the 1952 college football season.  In their first season under head coach Babe Caccia, the Bengals compiled a perfect 8–0 record, won the RMC championship, and outscored opponents by a total of 233 to 85. The team captains were Chet Lee and Lamont Jones.

Schedule

References

Idaho State
Idaho State Bengals football seasons
Rocky Mountain Athletic Conference football champion seasons
College football undefeated seasons
Idaho State Bengals football